Myripristis xanthacra, the yellowtip soldierfish, is a species of soldierfish belonging to the genus Myripristis. It can be found in the Western Indian Ocean in the southern half of the Red Sea and in Djibouti in the Gulf of Aden. It inhabits reef flats and slopes at depths below 18m.

References

xanthacra
Fish of the Pacific Ocean
Taxa named by John Ernest Randall